The Birth of a Band! is an album by  Quincy Jones that was released by Mercury with  performances by Zoot Sims, Clark Terry, Harry Edison, and Phil Woods.

Reception 

The Allmusic review by Scott Yanow called it "one of his finest jazz recordings".

Track listing 
 "The Birth of a Band" (Quincy Jones) – 2:53
 "Moanin'" (Bobby Timmons) – 3:02
 "I Remember Clifford" (Benny Golson) – 3:42
 "Along Came Betty" (Golson) – 3:21
 "Tickle Toe" (Lester Young) – 2:55
 "Happy Faces" (Sonny Stitt) – 2:40
 "Whisper Not" (Golson) – 3:22
 "The Gypsy" (Billy Reid) – 4:05
 "A Change of Pace" (Harry Arnold, Quincy Jones) – 3:20
 "Tuxedo Junction" (Erskine Hawkins, Bill Johnson, Julian Dash, Buddy Feyne) – 2:44

Personnel 
 Quincy Jones – arranger, conductor
 Harry Edison – trumpet
 Joe Newman – trumpet
 Ernie Royal – trumpet
 Clark Terry – trumpet
 Joe Wilder – trumpet
 Billy Byers – trombone
 Jimmy Cleveland – trombone
 Urbie Green – trombone
 Melba Liston – trombone
 Tom Mitchell – trombone
 Julius Watkins – French horn
 Jerome Richardson – flute, alto saxophone, tenor saxophone, piccolo
 Frank Wess – alto saxophone, flute
 Phil Woods – alto saxophone
 Benny Golson – tenor saxophone
 Budd Johnson – tenor saxophone
 Zoot Sims – tenor saxophone
 Sam Taylor – tenor saxophone
 Danny Bank – baritone saxophone
 Sahib Shihab – baritone saxophone
 Patti Bown – piano
 Moe Wechsler – piano
 Kenny Burrell– guitar
 Les Spann – guitar
 Milt Hinton – bass
 Jimmy Crawford - drums
 Osie Johnson – drums
 Don Lamond – drums
 Sam Woodyard – drums

References 

1959 albums
Mercury Records albums
Quincy Jones albums
Albums arranged by Quincy Jones
Albums arranged by Melba Liston